David Vera (born: 19 July 1970) is a sailor from Las Palmas de Gran Canaria, Spain. who represented his country at the 1996 Summer Olympics in Savannah, United States as crew member in the Soling. With helmsman Luis Doreste and fellow crew member Domingo Manrique they took the 6th place.

References

Living people
1970 births
Sailors at the 1996 Summer Olympics – Soling
Olympic sailors of Spain
Sportspeople from Las Palmas
Soling class world champions
Spanish male sailors (sport)